Aktyubinsky (masculine), Aktyubinskaya (feminine), or Aktyubinskoye (neuter) is the name of several inhabited localities in Russia.

Modern localities
Urban localities
Aktyubinsky, Republic of Tatarstan, an urban-type settlement in Aznakayevsky District of the Republic of Tatarstan

Rural localities
Aktyubinsky, Orenburg Oblast, a settlement in Aktyubinsky Selsoviet of Svetlinsky District in Orenburg Oblast

Alternative names
Aktyubinskaya, alternative name of Aktyuba, a village in Aryksky Rural Okrug of Malmyzhsky District in Kirov Oblast;